Piotr Aleksander Soczyński (born 18 January 1967) is a Polish retired international footballer who played as a defender.

Career

In 1991, Soczyński signed for Turkish side Fenerbahçe, where he made 27 league appearances and scored 0 goals and said, "in Istanbul, thirty thousand fans could attend training sessions". On 1 September 1991, he debuted for Fenerbahçe during a 1-2 loss to Aydınspor. In 1992, Soczyński signed for Olimpia Poznań in Poland, where he suffered relegation to the Polish second division.

In 1994, Soczyński signed for Turkish top flight club Vanspor. where he said, "there were many terrorists in Van, and the rulers wanted a substitute for normalcy. There are only mountains around. I lived in the barracks for three months, many of my friends were soldiers. We trained on a pitch full of holes, 40 meters by 20. Orlik is at the same time the pinnacle of luxury. I did not believe that a league team can practice in such conditions. They treated me exceptionally, because former Fenerbahce players didn't seem to be in that direction. The idyll ended with the arrival of the coach from Romania. He was looking for a place for his compatriots and had to get rid of the remaining foreigners from the team. They started insisting that I give up my money. During the conversations, they put the guns on the table. But I wasn't cracking. We reported to the Polish embassy,it helped. I did not let them go and it ended well".

After that, he signed for Intrat Wałcz in the Polish third division. Before the second half of 1999-00, Soczyński returned to Polish fourth division team Olimpia Poznań. Before the second half of 2007-08, he signed for Sokół II Aleksandrów Łódzki in the Polish sixth division.

References

External links
 
 

1967 births
Living people
Polish expatriate footballers
Association football defenders
Ekstraklasa players
Süper Lig players
Polish footballers
Vanspor footballers
Fenerbahçe S.K. footballers
Olimpia Poznań players
ŁKS Łódź players
Dyskobolia Grodzisk Wielkopolski players
Poland international footballers
Expatriate footballers in Turkey
Polish expatriate sportspeople in Turkey
Footballers from Łódź